Sant Joan d'Alacant or San Juan de Alicante (in Spanish) is a municipality belonging to Alicante metropolitan area, in the southeast of Valencian Community, Spain. It is the geographic center of the Old Garden of Alicante.  Its limits are with the settled areas of Alicante (7 km), Mutxamel (1 km) and El Campello (3 km).  It is within the Alicante metropolitan area and shares the same fire department and metro services.  Its population growth is due to its function as a bedroom community, as well as in recent years, its isolation from tourist areas, its cultural and academic activities, and because has part of the campus of the University Miguel Hernández of Elx/Elche. It comprises two zones: the town of Sant Joan and Benimagrell, which is now joined through its urban expansion.

As of the census of 2005, the population was 19,711.

References

Municipalities in the Province of Alicante